Jorge Gutiérrez may refer to:

 Jorge Gutiérrez (boxer) (born 1975), Cuban boxer
 Jorge Gutierrez (animator) (born 1975), Mexican animator, painter, writer & director
 Jorge Gutiérrez (squash player) (born 1979), Argentinian  squash player
 Jorge Gutiérrez (basketball) (born 1988), Mexican basketball player
 Jorge Gutiérrez (footballer) (born 1998), Panamanian footballer
 Jorge Gutiérrez Vera, former president of Luz y Fuerza del Centro